Okenia aspersa is a species of sea slug, a Dorid nudibranch, a marine gastropod mollusc in the family Goniodorididae.

Distribution
This species was first described from Cullercoats, North Sea. It has subsequently been reported widely in Britain and Ireland and north to Norway and south to Arcachon Bay, France.

Description
This goniodorid nudibranch is translucent white in colour, with spots and blotches of red-brown and cream It shows marbling over the body, on the pallial tentacles, rhinophores and gills.

Ecology
Okenia aspersa feeds on the tunicate Molgula occulta, family Molgulidae which lives buried in muddy sand seabeds.

References

Goniodorididae
Gastropods described in 1845
Molluscs of the Atlantic Ocean
Molluscs of Europe
Fauna of Norway